WordPerfect (WP) is a word processing application, now owned by Corel, with a long history on multiple personal computer platforms. At the height of its popularity in the 1980s and early 1990s, it was the dominant player in the word processor market, displacing the prior market leader WordStar.

It was originally developed under contract at Brigham Young University for use on a Data General minicomputer in the late 1970s. The authors retained the rights to the program, forming the Utah-based Satellite Software International (SSI) in 1979 to sell it; the program first came to market under the name SSI*WP in March 1980. It then moved to the MS-DOS operating system in 1982, by which time the name WordPerfect was in use, and several greatly updated versions quickly followed. The application's feature list was considerably more advanced than its main competition WordStar, an established program based on the operating system CP/M that failed to transition successfully onto MS-DOS, which replaced CP/M.  Satellite Software International changed its name to WordPerfect Corporation in 1985.

WordPerfect gained praise for its "look of sparseness" and clean display. It rapidly displaced most other systems, especially after the 4.2 release in 1986, and it became the standard in the DOS market by version 5.1 in 1989.  Its early popularity was based partly on its availability for a wide variety of computers and operating systems, and also partly because of extensive, no-cost support, with "hold jockeys" entertaining users while waiting on the phone.

Its dominant position ended after a failed release for Microsoft Windows due to Microsoft not initially sharing its Windows Application Programming Interface (API) specifications causing the application to be slow. After receiving the Windows APIs, there was a long delay in reprogramming before introducing an improved version. Microsoft Word had been introduced at the same time as WordPerfect's first attempt, and Word took over the market due to being faster, helped by aggressive bundling deals that ultimately produced Microsoft Office. WordPerfect was no longer a popular standard by the mid-1990s. WordPerfect Corporation was sold to Novell in 1994, which then sold the product to Corel in 1996. Corel has made regular releases to the product since then, often in the form of office suites under the WordPerfect name that include the Quattro Pro spreadsheet, the Presentations slides formatter, and other applications.

The common filename extension of WordPerfect document files is .wpd. Older versions of WordPerfect also used file extensions .wp, .wp7, .wp6, .wp5, .wp4, and originally, no extension at all.

WordPerfect for DOS

In 1979, Brigham Young University graduate student Bruce Bastian and computer science professor Alan Ashton created word processing software for a Data General minicomputer system owned by the city of Orem, Utah. Bastian and Ashton retained ownership of the software that they created. They then founded Satellite Software International, Inc., to market the program to other Data General users. WordPerfect 1.0 represented a significant departure from the previous Wang standard for word processing.

The first version of WordPerfect for the IBM PC was released the day after Thanksgiving in 1982. It was sold as WordPerfect 2.20, continuing the version numbering from the Data General program.  Over the next several months, three more minor releases arrived, mainly to correct bugs.

The developers had hoped to program WordPerfect in C, but at this early stage, there were no C compilers available for the IBM PC, and they had to program it in x86 assembly language. All versions of WordPerfect up to 5.0 were written in x86, and C was only adopted with WP 5.1, when it became necessary to convert it to non-IBM compatible computers. The use of straight assembly language and a high amount of direct screen access gave WordPerfect a significant performance advantage over WordStar, which used strictly DOS API functions for all screen and keyboard access, and was often very slow. In addition, WordStar, created for the CP/M operating system, in which subdirectories are not supported, was extremely slow in switching to support sub-directories in MS-DOS.

In 1983, WordPerfect 3.0 was released for DOS. This was  updated to support DOS 2.x, sub-directories, and hard disks. It also expanded printer support, where WordPerfect 2.x only supported Epson and Diablo printers that were hard-coded into the main program. Adding support for additional printers this way was impractical, so the company introduced printer drivers, a file containing a list of control codes for each model of printer. Version 3.0 had support for fifty different printers, and this was expanded to one hundred within a year. WordPerfect also supplied an editor utility that allowed users to make their own printer drivers, or to modify the included ones. Antic magazine observed, that "WordPerfect is almost unusable without its manual of over 600 pages!" A version of WordPerfect 3.0 became the Editor program of WordPerfect Office.

WordPerfect 4.0 was released in 1984. WordPerfect 4.2, released in 1986, introduced automatic paragraph numbering, which was important to law offices, and automatic numbering and placement of footnotes and endnotes that were important both to law offices and academics. It became the first program to overtake the original market leader WordStar in a major application category on the DOS platform.

By 1987, Compute! magazine described WordPerfect as "a standard in the MS-DOS world" and "a powerhouse program that includes almost everything". In November 1989, WordPerfect Corporation released the program's most successful version, WordPerfect 5.1 for DOS, which was the first version to include pull-down menus to supplement the traditional function key combinations, support for tables, a spreadsheet-like feature, and full support for typesetting options, such as italic, redline, and strike-through. This version also included "print preview", a graphical representation of the final printed output that became the foundation for WordPerfect 6.0's graphic screen editing. WordPerfect 5.1+ for DOS was introduced to allow older DOS-based PCs to utilize the new WordPerfect 6 file format. This version could read and write WordPerfect 6 files, included several third-party screen and printing applications (previously sold separately), and provided several minor improvements.

WordPerfect 6.0 for DOS, released in 1993, could switch between its traditional text-based display mode and a graphical display mode that showed the document as it would print out known as WYSIWYG (what you see is
what you get). The previous text-based versions used different colors, or text color inversions to indicate various markups, and a graphic mode only for an uneditable print preview that used generic fonts rather than the actual fonts that appeared on the printed page.

By the time WordPerfect 6.0 was released, the company had grown "to command more than 60 percent of the word processing software market."

Key characteristics

WordPerfect's distinguishing features include:
 extensive use of key combinations, especially on the MS-DOS platform, enabling quick access to features, once the meaning of the key combinations (like Ctrl–Shift–F6) had been memorized;
 its "streaming code" file format;
 its Reveal Codes feature; and
 its numbering of lines as the legal profession requires
 its macro/scripting capability, now provided through PerfectScript.

The ease of use of tools, like Mail Merge (combine form documents with data from any data source), "Print as booklet", and tables (with spreadsheet capabilities and the possibility to generate graphs) are also notable.

The WordPerfect document format allows continuous extending of functionality without jeopardizing backward and forward compatibility. Despite the fact that the newer version is extremely rich in functionality, WordPerfect X5 documents are fully compatible with WordPerfect 6.0a documents in both directions. The older program simply ignores the "unknown" codes, while rendering the known features of the document. WordPerfect users were never forced to upgrade for compatibility reasons for more than two decades.

Streaming code architecture
A key to WordPerfect's design is its streaming code architecture that parallels the formatting features of HTML and Cascading Style Sheets. Documents are created much the same way that raw HTML pages are written, with text interspersed by tags (called "codes") that trigger treatment of data until a corresponding closing tag is encountered, at which point the settings active to the point of the opening tag resume control. As with HTML, tags can be nested. Some data structures are treated as objects within the stream as with HTML's treatment of graphic images, e.g., footnotes and styles, but the bulk of a WordPerfect document's data and formatting codes appear as a single continuous stream. A difference between HTML tags and WordPerfect codes is that HTML codes can all be expressed as a string of plain text characters delimited by greater-than and less-than characters, e.g. <strong>text</strong>, whereas WordPerfect formatting codes consist of hexadecimal values.

Styles and style libraries

The addition of styles and style libraries in WP 5.0 provided greatly increased power and flexibility in formatting documents, while maintaining the streaming-code architecture of earlier versions. Styles are a preset arrangement of settings having to do with things like fonts, spacings, tab stops, margins and other items having to do with text layout. Styles can be created by the user to shortcut the setup time when starting a new document, and they can be saved in the program's style library. Prior to that, WordPerfect's only use of styles was the Opening Style, which contained the default settings for a document.

After the purchase of the desktop publishing program Ventura, Corel enhanced the WordPerfect styles editor and styles behavior with the majority of Ventura's capabilities. This improved the usability and performance of graphic elements like text boxes, document styles, footer and header styles.

Since WordPerfect has been enriched with properties from the CorelDraw Graphics suite, graphic styles are editable. The Graphics Styles editor enables customizing the appearance of boxes, borders, lines and fills and store the customized design for reuse. The possibilities include patterns and color gradients for fills; corner, endpoint, pen-type and thickness for lines. Box styles can be used as container style, including a border, lines, fill, text and caption; each with its separate style. A text box style shows that WordPerfect cascades its styles.

Around the same time, Corel included WordPerfect, with its full functionality, in CorelDraw Graphics Suite as the text editor.

Reveal codes

Present since the earliest versions of WordPerfect, the Reveal Codes feature distinguishes it from other word processors; Microsoft Word's equivalent is much less powerful.  It displays and allows editing the codes, reduces retyping, and enables easy formatting changes. It is a second editing screen that can be toggled open and closed, and sized as desired.

The codes for formatting and locating text are displayed, interspersed with tags and the occasional objects, with the tags and objects represented by named tokens. This provides a more detailed view to troubleshoot problems than with styles-based word processors, and object tokens can be clicked with a pointing device to directly open the configuration editor for the particular object type, e.g. clicking on a style token brings up the style editor with the particular style type displayed. WordPerfect had this feature already in its DOS incarnations.

Macro languages
WordPerfect for DOS stood out for its macros, in which sequences of keystrokes, including function codes, were recorded as the user typed them. These macros could then be assigned to any key desired. This enabled any sequence of keystrokes to be recorded, saved, and recalled. Macros could examine system data, make decisions, be chained together, and operate recursively until a defined "stop" condition occurred. This capability provided a powerful way to rearrange data and formatting codes within a document where the same sequence of actions needed to be performed repetitively, e.g., for tabular data. But since keystrokes were recorded, changes in the function of certain keys as the program evolved would mean that macros from one DOS version of WordPerfect would not necessarily run correctly on another version. Editing of macros was difficult until the introduction of a macro editor in Shell, in which a separate file for each WordPerfect product with macros enabled the screen display of the function codes used in the macros for that product.

WordPerfect DOS macros, which assumed a text-based screen, with fixed locations on the screen, could not, or could not easily, be implemented with the Windows WYSIWYG screen and mouse. For example, "go down four lines" has a clear meaning on a DOS screen, but no definite meaning with a Windows screen. WordPerfect lacked a way to meaningfully record mouse movements.

A new and even more powerful interpreted token-based macro recording and scripting language came with both DOS and Windows 6.0 versions, and that became the basis of the language named PerfectScript in later versions. PerfectScript has remained the mainstay scripting language for WordPerfect users ever since. It dealt with functions rather than with keystrokes. There was no way to import DOS macros, and users who had created extensive macro libraries were forced to continue using WordPerfect 5.1, or to rewrite all the macros from scratch using the new programming language.

An important property of WordPerfect macros is that they are not embedded in a document. As a result, WordPerfect is not prone to macro viruses or malware, unlike MS Word. Despite the term "macro", the language has hundreds of commands and functions and in fact creates full-fledged programs resident on and executed on the user's computer. In WPDOS 6 the source code is generated using the same interface used to edit documents. A WordPerfect macro can create or modify a document or perform tasks like displaying results of a calculation such as taking a date input, adding a specific number of days and displaying the new date in a dialog box. Documents created or edited by a WordPerfect macro are no different from those produced by manual input; the macros simply improve efficiency or automate repetitive tasks and also enabled creating content-rich document types, which would hardly be feasible manually.

The PerfectScript macro language shows especial versatility in its ability to deploy every function that exists in the entire office suite, no matter whether that function was designed for WordPerfect, Quattro Pro or Presentations. The macro development wizard presents and explains all of these functions. The number of functions available through PerfectScript is unparalleled in the office market.

On top of the functions available in the main components of the office suite, PerfectScript also provides the user with tools to build dialogs and forms. Widgets like buttons, input fields, drop-down lists and labels are easily combined to build user-friendly interfaces for custom office applications.
An example: a Dutch housing company (VZOS, Den Haag, several thousands of apartments) had its mutation administration build with WordPerfect.

Beginning with WordPerfect Office 10, the suite also included the Microsoft Office Visual Basic macro language as an alternative, meant to improve compatibility of the suite with Microsoft Office documents.

Macros may be used to create data entry programs which enter information directly into WordPerfect documents, saving the time and effort required to retype it.

Support for European languages

WordPerfect had support for European languages other than English.
The Language Resource File (WP.LRS) specified language formatting conventions.

In addition, WordPerfect Corporation did some aggressive marketing in Europe.  In January 1993 they signed a three-year, $16 million deal to sponsor the WordPerfect cycling team in international competitions.  The team was directed by the Dutchman Jan Raas.  The move was intended to raise WordPerfect's profile throughout Europe and especially in the Alpine countries of France, Switzerland, and Italy, and it was also thought that young bicycling enthusiasts fit the WordPerfect user profile in the United States.  In the third year of the deal, 1995, Novell took over the sponsorship, due to having acquired WordPerfect.

Function keys
Like its 1970s predecessor Emacs and mid-1980s competitor, MultiMate, WordPerfect used almost every possible combination of function keys with Ctrl, Alt, and Shift modifiers, and the CtrlAlt, ShiftAlt, and ShiftCtrl double modifiers, unlike early versions of WordStar, which used only Ctrl.

WordPerfect used F3 instead of F1 for Help, F1 instead of Esc for Cancel, and Esc for Repeat (though a configuration option in later versions allowed these functions to be rotated to locations that later became more standard).

The extensive number of key combinations are now one of WordPerfect's most popular features among its regular "power users" such as legal secretaries, paralegals and attorneys.

Printer drivers
WordPerfect for DOS shipped with an impressive array of printer drivers—a feature that played an important role in its adoption—and also shipped with a printer driver editor called PTR, which features a flexible macro language and allows technically inclined users to customize and create printer drivers.

An interesting feature of the DOS 5.0 version was its Type-Through feature.  It allowed a user with certain compatible printers to use WordPerfect as a conventional typewriter.  This functionality was removed in the DOS 5.1 version.

WordPerfect Library/Office utilities
WordPerfect Corporation produced a variety of ancillary and spin-off products. WordPerfect Library, introduced in 1986 and later renamed WordPerfect Office (not to be confused with Corel's Windows office suite of the same name), was a package of DOS network and stand-alone utility software for use with WordPerfect. The package included a DOS menu shell and file manager which could edit binary files as well as WordPerfect or Shell macros, calendar, and a general-purpose flat file database program that could be used as the data file for a merge in WordPerfect and as a contact manager.

After Novell acquired WordPerfect Corporation, it incorporated many of these utilities into Novell GroupWise.

LetterPerfect
In 1990 WordPerfect Corporation also offered LetterPerfect, which was a reduced-functionality version of WP-DOS 5.1 intended for use on less-capable hardware such as the laptops of the day, and as an entry-level product for students and home users; the name (but not the code) was purchased from a small Missouri company that had produced a basic word processor for early Atari computers. LP did not support tables, labels, sorting, equation editing or styles. It sold for about US$100 but did not catch on and was soon discontinued.

DataPerfect
Another program distributed through WordPerfect Corporation (and later through Novell) was DataPerfect for DOS, a fast and capable hierarchical database management system (DBMS) requiring as little as 300 KB of free DOS memory to run. It was written by Lew Bastian. In December 1995, Novell released DataPerfect as copyrighted freeware and allowed the original author to continue to update the program. Updates were developed until at least 2008.

DataPerfect supports up to 99 data files ("panels") with each holding up to 16 million records of up to 125 fields and an unlimited number of variable-length memo fields which can store up to 64,000 characters each. Networked, DataPerfect supports up to  simultaneous users.

PlanPerfect
Another program distributed through WordPerfect Corporation was PlanPerfect, a spreadsheet application. The first version with that name was reviewed in InfoWorld magazine September 1987.

WordPerfect for Windows

History
WordPerfect was late in coming to market with a Windows version. WordPerfect 5.1 for Windows, introduced in 1991, had to be installed from DOS and was largely unpopular due to serious stability issues.
The first mature version, WordPerfect 5.2 for Windows was released in November 1992 and WordPerfect 6.0 for Windows was released in 1993.  By the time WordPerfect 5.2 for Windows was introduced, Microsoft Word for Windows version 2 had been on the market for over a year and had received its third interim release, v2.0c.

WordPerfect's function-key-centered user interface did not adapt well to the new paradigm of mouse and pull-down menus, especially with many of WordPerfect's standard key combinations pre-empted by incompatible keyboard shortcuts that Windows itself used; for example, Alt-F4 became Exit Program, as opposed to WordPerfect's Block Text. The DOS version's impressive arsenal of finely tuned printer drivers was also rendered obsolete by Windows' use of its own printer device drivers.

WordPerfect Office Suite

WordPerfect became part of an office suite when the company entered into a co-licensing agreement with Borland Software Corporation in 1993. The offerings were marketed as Borland Office, containing Windows versions of WordPerfect, Quattro Pro, Borland Paradox, and a LAN-based groupware package called WordPerfect Office. Originally based on the WordPerfect Library for DOS, the Novell / WordPerfect Office suite was integrated by "middleware". The most important middleware-suite, still active in current versions of WordPerfect Office, is called PerfectFit (developed by WordPerfect). The other "middleware" (developed by Novell) was called AppWare.

Novell buys WordPerfect Company

The WordPerfect product line was sold twice, first to Novell in June 1994, who then sold it (at a big loss) to Corel in January 1996. However, Novell kept the WordPerfect Office technology, incorporating it into its GroupWise messaging and collaboration product.

Microsoft vs Novell

Compounding WordPerfect's troubles were issues associated with the release of the first 32-bit version, WordPerfect 7, intended for use on Windows 95. In the lawsuit 'Novell v. Microsoft', Novell argued that these problems were due to anti-competitive acts by Microsoft.

While WordPerfect 7 contained notable improvements over the 16-bit WordPerfect for Windows 3.1, it was released in May 1996, nine months after the introduction of Windows 95 and Microsoft Office 95 (including Word 95). The initial release suffered from notable stability problems. WordPerfect 7 also did not have a Microsoft "Designed for Windows 95" logo. This was important to some Windows 95 software purchasers as Microsoft set standards for application design, behavior, and interaction with the operating system. To make matters worse, the original release of WordPerfect 7 was incompatible with Windows NT, hindering its adoption in many professional environments. The "NT Enabled" version of WordPerfect 7, which Corel considered to be Service Pack 2, was not available until Q1-1997, over six months after the introduction of Windows NT 4.0, a year and a half after the introduction of Office 95 (which supported Windows NT out of the box), and shortly after the introduction of Office 97.

Market share
While WordPerfect dominated the DOS market, Microsoft shifted its attention toward a Windows version of Word; after Windows 3.0 was introduced, Word's market share began to grow at an extraordinary rate.  A Windows version of WordPerfect was not introduced until nearly two years after Windows 3.0, and was met with poor reviews. Word also benefited from being included in an integrated office suite package much sooner than WordPerfect. While WordPerfect had more than 50% of the worldwide word-processing market in 1995, by 2000 Word had up to 95%; it was so dominant that WordPerfect executives admitted that their software needed to be compatible with Word documents to survive.

Application integration and middleware
While Microsoft offered something that looked like a fully integrated office suite in Microsoft Office, a common complaint about early Windows versions of WordPerfect Office was that it looked like a collection of separate applications from different vendors cobbled together, with inconsistent user interfaces from one application to another.

In fact, enabling applications from various software developers to work together on every platform was part of the Novell strategy. Novell had acquired WordPerfect for Windows from WordPerfect Corporation, Paradox from Borland, and various peripheral utilities from other companies and had started to evangelize the Novell "middleware" – Appware – as a means for others to run their programs on every operating system. This "middleware" strategy would make software vendors and customers independent from operating system vendors, like Microsoft, thus posing a real threat.

Contrary to Microsoft with its MS Office however, starting with WordPerfect Office 9, Corel successfully integrated the components of WordPerfect Office almost seamlessly. PerfectScript and the middleware PerfectFit played the major role here. Elements of applications like CorelDraw and Ventura desktop publishing were also integrated and enriched the document format.

Faithful customers

Among the remaining avid users of WordPerfect are many law firms and government offices, which favor WordPerfect features such as macros, reveal codes, and the ability to access a large range of formatting options such as left-right block indent directly with key combinations rather than having to click through several layers of submenus as Microsoft Word often requires. Fast typists appreciate the ability to keep their hands on the keyboard, rather than reaching for the mouse as often as would be required if they were using Microsoft Word.  WordPerfect users may also define any key or key combination to do what they want, such as typing phrases they often use or executing macros.  The user interface has stayed almost identical from WPWin 6 through WP X5 (2010) and file formats have not changed, as incompatible new formats would require keeping both obsolete software versions and obsolete hardware around just to access old documents.

Corel has catered to these markets, with, for example, a major sale to the United States Department of Justice in 2005. A related factor is that WordPerfect Corporation was particularly responsive to feature requests from the legal profession, incorporating many features particularly useful to that niche market; those features have been continued in subsequent versions, usually directly accessible with key combinations.

Novell v. Microsoft antitrust lawsuit
In November 2004, Novell filed an antitrust lawsuit against Microsoft for alleged anti-competitive behavior (such as tying Word to sales of Windows) that Novell claims led to loss of WordPerfect market share. That lawsuit, after several delays, was dismissed in July 2012. Novell filed an appeal against the judgment in November 2012 but this too was dismissed by the US Supreme Court in 2014 without comment, ending the legal action almost a decade after it was begun.

Corel buys WordPerfect from Novell
Novell stated in November 1995 that it was putting its personal productivity product line up for sale.  Then in January 1996 it announced that the sale of these products, primarily WordPerfect and Quattro Pro, would be made to Corel for $186 million, a large loss from the $855 million that it had originally paid to acquire WordPerfect.  Novell did hold onto a few pieces that it had acquired from WordPerfect, most importantly the GroupWise collaboration product. By some estimates Novell had lost $750 million on the WordPerfect experience. 

The sale to Corel, which was headquartered in Ottawa, Ontario, was completed in March 1996. The head of Corel, Michael Cowpland, initially expressed optimism that Corel WordPerfect could compete effectively against Microsoft Word among business users, somewhat akin to a Coke versus Pepsi battle. However this was unsuccessful as Microsoft got many new computers loaded with Word along with Windows. The financial realities of the situation became difficult and Corel lost over $230 million for 1997.  

During 1998, the WordPerfect development offices in Orem were closed, affecting over 500 employees. The software engineering for WordPerfect became centred in Corel's home city of Ottawa.

Corel WordPerfect

Since its acquisition by Corel in 1996, WordPerfect for Windows has officially been known as Corel WordPerfect. 

On January 17, 2006, Corel announced WordPerfect X3. Corel is an original member of the OASIS Technical Committee on the OpenDocument Format, and Paul Langille, a senior Corel developer, is one of the original four authors of the OpenDocument specification.

In January 2006, subscribers to Corel's electronic newsletter were informed that WordPerfect 13 was scheduled for release later in 2006. The subsequent release of X3 (identified as "13" internally and in registry entries) has been met with generally positive reviews, due to new features including a unique PDF import capability, metadata removal tools, integrated search and online resources and other features.

Version X3 was described by CNET in January, 2006 as a "winner", "a feature-packed productivity suite that's just as easy to use — and in many ways more innovative than — industry-goliath Microsoft Office 2003." CNET went on to describe X3 as "a solid upgrade for long-time users", but that "Die-hard Microsoft fans may want to wait to see what Redmond has up its sleeve with the radical changes expected within the upcoming Microsoft Office 12."

While the notable if incremental enhancements of WordPerfect Office X3 have been well received by reviewers, a number of online forums have voiced concern about the future direction of WordPerfect, with long-time users complaining about certain usability and functionality issues that users have been asking to have fixed for the last few release versions.

Although the released version of X3 at the time did not support the OOXML or OpenDocument formats, a beta was released that supported both.

Reports surfaced late in January 2006 that Apple's iWork had leapfrogged WordPerfect Office as the leading alternative to Microsoft Office. This claim was soon debunked after industry analyst Joe Wilcox described JupiterResearch usage surveys that showed WordPerfect as the No. 2 office suite behind Microsoft Office in the consumer, small and medium businesses, and enterprise markets with a roughly 15 percent share in each market.

In April 2008, Corel released its WordPerfect Office X4 office suite containing the new X4 version of WordPerfect which includes support for PDF editing, OpenDocument and Office Open XML. However, X4 does not include support for editing PDF's containing images in JPEG2000 format, a format used by Adobe Acrobat 9.

In March 2010, Corel released its WordPerfect Office X5 office suite, which contains the new X5 version of WordPerfect. This version includes improved support for PDF, Microsoft Office 2007, OpenDocument, and Office Open XML. The new release includes integration with Microsoft SharePoint and other web services geared towards government and business users.

In April 2012, Corel released its WordPerfect Office X6 office suite, which contains the new X6 version of WordPerfect. The new release adds multi-document/monitor support, new macros, Windows 8 preview support, and an eBook publisher.

In May 2021, Corel released its WordPerfect Office 2021 office suite, which superseded versions x7 through x9 and version 2020. New features include creating fillable PDFs, built in Bates numbering (since X7), saving to opendocument and ePub formats (since v2020), and saving and opening Microsoft Office openXML formats (which did not work in x9).

WordPerfect Suite and WordPerfect Office 

WordPerfect Suite and WordPerfect Office is an office suite developed by Corel Corporation. It originates from Borland Software Corporation's Borland Office, released in 1993 to compete against Microsoft Office and AppleWorks. Borland's suite bundled three key applications: WordPerfect, Quattro Pro and Paradox. Borland then sold the suite to Novell in 1994, which led to the addition of Novell Presentations and the now-defunct InfoCentral. It was then sold to Corel in 1996.

Corel WordPerfect Suite 7 and Office 7 Professional
Corel WordPerfect Suite 7 featured version 7 of its core applications: WordPerfect, Quattro Pro and Presentations while Office 7 Professional included Paradox as well. Both versions of the suite also bundled CorelFLOW 3, Sidekick, Dashboard and Envoy 7. The suite for Windows was released in 1996 to retail.

Corel WordPerfect Office 2000

Corel WordPerfect Office 2000 featured version 9 of its core applications: WordPerfect, Quattro Pro, Presentations, Paradox and CorelCentral. All versions of the suite also bundle Trellix 2 and Microsoft Visual Basic for Applications. The suite for Windows was released on November 16, 1998, as a preview and on May 25, 1999, to retail.  The Home and Student edition, as well as the Family Pack, omit the Presentations and Paradox software.  Small Business edition was released on January 31, 2000, and omits Paradox.

Several variants of this suite exist. One of these is the Family Pack, sold in versions 2 and 3 at a reduced price. This version cannot be used in a commercial setting. Three variants of the suite were created to integrate voice recognition. The first, the Voice Powered Edition, includes Dragon Naturally Speaking 3 and was released in North America. The second, available at some international locations, included Philips newest generation of FreeSpeech. The third is WordPerfect Law Office 2000, released on December 20, 1999. It features NaturallySpeaking Standard 4 and bundles several programs designed for lawyers. Another notable variant is WordPerfect Office 2000 for Linux, released on March 10, 2000. Although it supports various Linux distributions, it was designed with Corel Linux in mind as a way to upgrade such systems, which bundled a free version of the WordPerfect word processor.

Latest version
The latest version is WordPerfect Office 2021, released May 2021.

Quattro Pro

Quattro Pro is a spreadsheet program that originally competed against the dominant Lotus 1-2-3 and now competes against LibreOffice Calc, Microsoft Excel, Google Sheets and Apple's Numbers. Corel's application is available only for the Windows platform.

Presentations

Presentations is a presentation program by Corel. Its main competitors include LibreOffice Impress, Microsoft PowerPoint, Google Slides, and Apple's Keynote.

WordPerfect Lightning

WordPerfect Lightning is a note-taking application. Its main competitors are Evernote, Microsoft OneNote, Google Keep and Apple's Notes.

Other desktop applications
Paradox is a relational database manager for Windows. Its main competitors are LibreOffice Base and Microsoft Access.

"Classic Mode"
Corel added "Classic Mode" in WordPerfect 11. Although this displays the "classic" cyan Courier text on medium blue background, it is not a true emulation of the DOS version. It does select the WPDOS 5.1 Keyboard. (The 6.1 Keyboard is available too.) The WPWin macro system, which remains unchanged, is quite different from that of WPDOS, and conversion is not easy. The menu remains the WPWin menu, and the available Toolbars are WPWin toolbars.

Version history

Summary
WordPerfect 9 and newer are bundled with the WordPerfect Office Suite and cannot be purchased separately.

In addition, versions of WordPerfect have also been available for Apricot, Tandy 2000, TI Professional, Victor 9000, and Zenith Z-100 systems.

Known versions for IBM System/370 include 4.2, released 1988.

Known versions for the DEC Rainbow 100 include version (?), released November 1983.

Unix

Known versions for Sun include WordPerfect 6.0, requiring SunOS or Solaris 2, year of release unknown.

At one time or another, WordPerfect was available on around 30 flavors of Unix, including AT&T, NCR, SCO Xenix, Microport Unix, DEC Ultrix, Pyramid Tech Unix, Tru64, IBM AIX, Motorola 8000, and HP9000, SGI IRIX and Sun-3.

In July 2022, Travis Ormandy ported "WordPerfect for Unix" 7, to modern Linux distributions, as a fully functional deb package.  While the program does not print to CUPS printers, it can print to a file.

Macintosh
Development of WordPerfect for Macintosh did not run parallel to versions for other operating systems, and used version numbers unconnected to contemporary releases for DOS and Windows. Version 2 was a total rewrite, adhering more closely to Apple's UI guidelines. Version 3 took this further, making extensive use of the technologies Apple introduced in Systems 7.0–7.5, while remaining fast and capable of running well on older machines. Corel released version 3.5 in 1996, followed by the improved version 3.5e (for enhanced) in 1997. It was never updated beyond that, and the product was eventually discontinued. , Corel has reiterated that the company has no plans to further develop WordPerfect for Macintosh (such as creating a native Mac OS X version).

For several years, Corel allowed Mac users to download version 3.5e from their website free of charge, and some Mac users still use this version. The download is still available at the Mac IO group (successor to the Yahoo group) along with the necessary OS 8/9/Classic Updater that slows scroll speed and restores functionality to the Style and Window menus. Like other Mac OS applications of its age, it requires the Classic environment on PowerPC Macs. While Intel Macs do not support Classic, emulators such as SheepShaver, Basilisk II and vMac allow users to run WordPerfect on any Macintosh computer (or indeed any Linux computer). Users wishing to use a current release of WordPerfect can run the Windows version through Boot Camp or virtualization software, and through Darwine or CrossOver Mac with mixed results.

Atari ST
Like the Macintosh version, development of WordPerfect for the Atari ST did not run parallel to the DOS versions.  However the Atari ST version number aligned with contemporary DOS releases. In 1987, WordPerfect Corp. released version 4.1. This was the only Atari version ever released, but numerous patches and updates ensured that the Atari version of WordPerfect ran on all Atari ST, Atari STe, TT, and Falcon computers.

WordPerfect ST differs from the DOS version most notably in speed and number of windows a user can open.  On the Atari ST version, a user can open up to four windows (compared to DOS' two) and the application runs three to five times faster than the DOS version (depending on which update or patch is installed).  This was possible because WordPerfect for the Atari ST was designed from the ground up and was optimized for the Motorola 68000 processor as well as Atari's GEM (Graphics Environment Manager) operating system.

WordPerfect for the Atari ST retailed at US$395 with a student version for US$99.  The price of WordPerfect was significantly higher than most of the other Atari word processors available at the time.  Atari Corporation published a version of Microsoft Write (the Atari version of Microsoft Word 1.05 for the Macintosh) for US$129.95 (almost 75% off the suggested retail price of WordPerfect), which did not help WordPerfect's campaign to establish itself as the standard word processor on the Atari platform.

Like other versions, WordPerfect for the ST was not copy-protected. In 1988 WordPerfect threatened to abandon the Atari market after copies of the word processor were found on several pirate bulletin board systems. However, support from the Atari community convinced WordPerfect to reconsider and support for the Atari ST continued, but only a single developer was assigned to the project to fix bugs.

A WordPerfect 5.1 version for the Atari ST was planned and in development but was later cancelled.

Amiga
In 1987, WordPerfect was ported to the Amiga 1000 and was upgraded through version 4.1 on the Amiga platform despite rumors of its discontinuation. The company's efforts were not well supported by Amiga users and it did not sell well. Though it could be started from the Workbench or CLI, WordPerfect remained a fundamentally text-oriented program and retained its DOS command structure. Satellite Software received criticism for releasing a non-graphical word processor on a graphically oriented system.

In 1989, WordPerfect Corporation stopped all Amiga development, including work on a version of PlanPerfect, stating that it had lost $800,000 on the computer and could not afford to add Amiga-specific features. After customers stated that they would be satisfied with a DOS-like word processor the company resumed development of only the Amiga version of WordPerfect, but discontinued it in 1992.

Linux
In 1995, WordPerfect 6.0 was made available for Linux as part of Caldera's internet office package. In late 1997, a newer version was made available for download, but had to be purchased to be activated.

In 1998 Corel released WordPerfect 8.0 for Linux. The full version was sold as a package. A cut-down version was made available for downloading.

Hoping to establish themselves in the nascent commercial Linux market, Corel also developed their own distribution of Linux. This included WordPerfect 8.1 for Linux. Although the Linux distribution was fairly well-received, the response to WordPerfect for Linux varied. Some Linux promoters  appreciated the availability of a well-known, mainstream application for the operating system.

Once OpenOffice.org appeared in 1999, there was little demand for a proprietary, closed-source project like WordPerfect. On top of this, WordPerfect 9.0, which was released as part of the WordPerfect Office 2000 for Linux package, was not a native Linux application like WP 6–8, but derived from the Windows version using Corel's own version of the Wine compatibility library, and hence had performance problems.

WordPerfect failed to gain a large user base, and as part of Corel's change of strategic direction following a (non-voting) investment by Microsoft, WordPerfect for Linux was discontinued and their Linux distribution was sold to Xandros. In April 2004, Corel re-released WordPerfect 8.1 (the last Linux-native version) with some updates, as a "proof of concept" and to test the Linux market. , WordPerfect for Linux is not available for purchase; however, it can still be found used, in online marketplaces.

As of 2022, WordPerfect for Linux (also known as xwp) can still be run on modern distros.

Linux applications may use the libwpd library to convert WordPerfect documents.

iOS
A WordPerfect X7 app for iOS was released in 2014, but it was merely remote desktop software that connected to a Corel-hosted WordPerfect for Windows session. It was billed as a "Limited Free Trial" and was eventually discontinued by Corel.

Unicode and Asian language editing
WordPerfect lacks support for Unicode, which limits its usefulness in many markets outside North America and Western Europe. Despite pleas from long-time users, this feature has not yet been implemented.

For users in WordPerfect's traditional markets, the inability to deal with complex character sets, such as Asian language scripts, can cause difficulty when working on documents containing those characters. However, later versions have provided better compliance with interface conventions, file compatibility, and even Word interface emulation.

However, WordPerfect X4 was reported to be able to import IPA character set, and copy and paste works as long as the pastes into WP are done via Paste Special > Unicode command. Publishing to PDF from WordPerfect embeds the WP-phonetic font together with the Unicode-compatible font.

Reception

PC Magazine stated in March 1983 that "WordPerfect is very impressive, a more than full-featured program with a few truly state-of-the-art goodies tucked into the package". It cited WordPerfect's inclusion of mail merge, footnotes, and macros—all missing from WordStar—as well as "virtually every ... feature that one ought to expect from a higher-priced program" including find-and-replace, bold and underline display, and automatic paragraph reflow. Byte in December 1984 noted the application's built-in print buffer, ability to show bold, underline, and centered text, and extensive math capabilities. It criticized the quality of the spell checker and difficult tab settings, but concluded that "its powerful capabilities far outweigh the problems mentioned". Compute! in August 1985 called WordPerfect "excellent". It especially praised the clean, uncluttered screen and fast spell checker. Noting the spell checker's size and the company's "excellent track record of supporting its software", Antic in May 1988 concluded that "If you want to own the most power-packed word processor available for the ST today, and can live with the relative complexity needed for harnessing this power, WordPerfect is what you've been waiting for."

See also
 Ability Office – repackaged and sold as Corel Home Office and Corel Office Suite by Corel, but using Ability and Microsoft's file formats instead of WordPerfect Office file formats
 Comparison of word processors
 List of word processors
 Office Open XML software
 OpenDocument software
 List of office suites
 Comparison of office suites

References

Further reading

External links
 
 Corel WordPerfect Office Press kit: 12 Small Business Edition, X3, X4, X5, X6
 Corel WordPerfect Office X6 – Standard Edition
 Older Wordperfect manuals, pre-Borland and Corel
 Using WordPerfect on Linux – 2022

Download sites
 WordPerfect for DOS Updated—New printer drivers, updates, and added features for WordPerfect for DOS 5.1 and 6.x (with pages on WP on the Mac and Linux). All you need to know about WPDOS 5.1, 6.0, 6.1, and 6.2 on modern computers.
 http://www.gmccomb.com/wpdos/toc.htm – out-of-print book on WP macros and templates (free legal download)
 WordPerfect Shell 3.1 and 4.0 download
 WordPerfect Editor download

1979 software
Amiga software
Atari ST software
Classic Mac OS word processors
Computer-related introductions in 1979
Corel software
DOS software
IRIX software
Linux word processors
Novell software
Office suites
Office suites for Linux
Office suites for Windows
PDF software
Proprietary cross-platform software
Windows word processors
Word processors